Church of the Good Samaritan may refer to:

Anglican Church of the Good Samaritan, St. John's, Newfoundland and Labrador, Canada
Episcopal Church of the Good Samaritan, Corvallis, Oregon, United States

See also 
The Good Samaritan (disambiguation)